Kuwaniidae is a family of scales and mealybugs in the order Hemiptera. There are at least 4 genera and about 14 described species in Kuwaniidae.

Genera
These four genera belong to the family Kuwaniidae:
 Kuwania Cockerell, 1903
 Neogreenia Neogreenia MacGillivray, 1921
 Neosteingelia Morrison, 1927
 † Hoffeinsia Koteja, 2008

References

Further reading

 

Scale insects
Hemiptera families